Beisanhuan is a metro station of Zhengzhou Metro Line 2.

The name of the station is after the North 3rd Ring Road. However, the station is hundreds of meters south to the road. The transfer to Zhengzhou BRT on the North 3rd Ring Road from this station is not convenient.

Station layout  
The 2-level underground station has a single island platform. The station concourse is on the B1 level and the B2 level is for the platforms.

Exits

Surroundings
 Henan Television Station

References 

Stations of Zhengzhou Metro
Line 2, Zhengzhou Metro
Railway stations in China opened in 2016